Boende is a town and capital of Tshuapa Province, lying on the Tshuapa River, in the Democratic Republic of Congo. It is a river port with riverboats sailing to Kinshasa via Mbandaka and is also home to an airport. As of 2009 it had an estimated population of 36,158. The national language used locally is Lingala.

Climate
Boende has an equatorial tropical rainforest climate (Köppen Af) and is hot, humid and wet all year round without pronounced variations in temperature or rainfall.

References

Populated places in Tshuapa